Charles-Joseph Chambet (6 September 1792 – 16 November 1867 ) was a French bookseller, essayist, bibliophile and playwright.

A bookseller in Lyon, his plays were presented at the Théâtre des Célestins.

Works 
1815: Le conducteur de l'étranger à Lyon
1822: Almanach des Muses de Lyon et du Midi de la France
1822: Le langage de l'amour, in prose and in verses
1823: Tablettes historiques et littéraires
1823: Extrait du catalogue de la librairie de Chambet fils aîné
1824: Anecdotes du dix-neuvième siècle et de la fin du dix-huitième, la plupart secrètes et inédites
1824: Les souvenirs d'un oisif, ou l'esprit des autres
1824: Amour et galanterie, vaudeville in 1 act, with Liénard
1828: Choix de caractères, anecdotes, petits dialogues philosophiques, maximes et pensées
1830: Laurette ou Trois mois à Paris, comédie en vaudevilles in 3 acts and 3 periods, with A.-F. Liénard and Eugène de Lamerlière
1831: Histoire de l'inondation
1833: Emblèmes des fleurs, ou Parterre de Flore
1833: Théodore
1836: Guide pittoresque de l'étranger à Lyon
1853: Nouveau guide pittoresque de l’étranger à Lyon

Bibliography 
 Biographie contemporaine des gens de lettres de Lyon, 1826, p. 22-23 (Read on line) 
 Joseph Marie Quérard, Les supercheries littéraires dévoilées, Vol.5, 1853, p. 102

References 

19th-century French dramatists and playwrights
French booksellers
French bibliophiles
People from Rhône (department)
1792 births
1867 deaths